Dumisani Percervearance Zuma (born 22 May 1995) is a South African soccer player who plays as a midfielder for AmaZulu and the South Africa national football team. He previously played for Bloemfontein Celtic and Kaizer Chiefs.

Club career

Early career
Born in Pietermaritzburg, Zuma started his youth career at the age of 11 with amateur side Grange and played for Maritzburg City before moving to Kings United in 2010.

Bloemfontein Celtic
At the beginning of the 2014–15 season, Zuma joined South African Premier Division side Bloemfontein Celtic from Kings United. He impressed early on in his spell at Celtic, with manager Ernst Middendorp describing him as 'one of the best young talents he had ever seen'. His first season at the club saw him make twenty league appearances, scoring once. He appeared 18 times in the league for the club across the 2015–16 season, scoring once, before appearing 19 times without scoring in the league across the 2016–17 season.

Kaizer Chiefs
In July 2017, Zuma signed for fellow South African Premier Division side Kaizer Chiefs on a three-year contract. His first goal for the club came on his 11th appearance for the club on 16 December 2017 in a 1–0 victory over Ajax Cape Town. In total, he scored 3 goals across 17 league appearances during the 2017–18 season. The 2018–19 season saw him score twice in 18 league appearances for Chiefs.

In September 2019, Zuma signed a new contract with Chiefs, lasting until July 2023. Zuma made his first start of the 2019–20 season on 6 November 2019, scoring a brace in a 2–0 victory against Chippa United
with the first of his goals winning him the South African Premier Division Goal of the Month award for November 2019.

International career
Zuma has represented South Africa internationally at under-20 and under-23 levels. In July 2017, he earned his first senior cap for South Africa in a 1–0 African Nations Championship qualification victory over Botswana, before making a further two appearances for South Africa in August 2017.

Style of play
Zuma is primarily a winger but can also play as a striker.

Personal life
Zuma grew up supporting Kaizer Chiefs since the rest of his family also supported the club. His mother died in 2010 and his father died two years later in 2012.

References

1995 births
Living people
Sportspeople from Pietermaritzburg
South African soccer players
Association football midfielders
Bloemfontein Celtic F.C. players
Kaizer Chiefs F.C. players
AmaZulu F.C. players
South African Premier Division players
South Africa international soccer players
South Africa youth international soccer players